{{DISPLAYTITLE:Gamma1 Caeli}}

Gamma1 Caeli, Latinized from γ1 Caeli, is a double star in the constellation Caelum.  It consists of a K-type giant, and a G-type subgiant.

Properties

Component A 
Gamma1 Caeli A has an apparent magnitude of 4.57, which makes it barely visible to the naked eye. According to parallax, the star is located 185 light years away. Gamma1 Caeli A has a similar mass to the Sun, but expanded to 14.3 times the Sun's girth. It radiates at 69.9 times the Sun's luminosity from its swollen photosphere at an effective temperature of 4,411 K.

Component B 
Gamma1 Caeli B has an apparent magnitude of 8.07, which makes it visible only in binoculars, and is located at a similar distance to Component A. It has 91% of the Sun's mass, and is metal poor, with 79% the abundance of heavy metals compared to the Sun.

References

Caeli, Gamma1
Caelum
Binary stars
K-type giants
032831
023595
1652
Durchmusterung objects
G-type subgiants